Bendita seas is a 1956 Argentine film. A drama directed by Luis Mottura, script by Eliseo Montaine and María Luz Regás based on the theater play by Alberto Novión.  The movie was released on March 8, 1956.

Cast
Mecha Ortiz as Doña Maria
Enrique Serrano as Aniceto
Guillermo Battaglia as Francisco Aguelles
Domingo Alzugaray as Enrique
Luis Medina Castro as Javier
José de Angelis as Don Pedro

References

External links
 

1956 films
1950s Spanish-language films
Argentine black-and-white films
1950s Argentine films
Argentine drama films
1956 drama films